Henry Clarke Warren (1854–1899) was an American scholar of Sanskrit and Pali. Warren along with Charles Rockwell Lanman founded the Harvard Oriental Series in 1891; on his death in 1899 he left $15000 towards its publication.

Life
He was the second of four sons of Susan Cornelia Clarke (1825-1901) and Samuel Denis Warren (1817-1888), a wealthy paper manufacturer in Boston, who died in 1888. He had four siblings: Cornelia Lyman Warren, philanthropist; Samuel D. Warren II (1854-1899), businessperson; Edward Perry Warren (1860-1928), art collector; Fredrick Fiske Warren (1862-1938), political radical and utopist. A fall as a young boy caused a spine injury which left him impaired for the rest of his life. He graduated in 1879 with an A.B. from Harvard University, and followed it up with studies at Johns Hopkins University under Lanman and Maurice Bloomfield, and at Oxford University with T. W. Rhys Davids. He purchased the house of Charles Beck in 1891, and lived in it until his death in 1899 at which he bequeathed it, along with the bulk of his estate, to Harvard University; the building is now known as the Beck-Warren House (or Warren House). 

His work Buddhism in Translation (1896) and translation (along with Dharmananda Damodar Kosambi) of the Visuddhimagga of Buddhaghosa (1950) respectively appeared as Volume 3 and Volume 41 of the Harvard Oriental Series.

References
 Obituary: Lanman, C. R.; Henry Clarke Warren (1854-1899): A Brief Memorial; Buddhist Annual of Ceylon, Vol I (1920), No. 2, p. 28-32

External links
 Harvard Oriental Series
 
 

1854 births
1899 deaths
Harvard University alumni
Johns Hopkins University alumni